FC Shakhtyor Prokopyevsk is a Russian football club from Prokopyevsk that currently plays in amateur competitions. It played professionally in 1946, 1962–1970, 1972–1974, 1994–1996 and 2001–2007. It played for one season in the second-highest level (Soviet First League) in 1962.

Team name history
 1946 FC Ugolshchik Prokopyevsk
 1962–1974 FC Shakhtyor Prokopyevsk
 1992–1996 FC Motor Prokopyevsk
 1997 FC Shakhtyor Prokopyevsk
 1998–1999 FC Shakhtyor-PDZ Prokopyevsk
 2000– FC Shakhtyor Prokopyevsk

External links
  Team history at KLISF

Association football clubs established in 1946
Football clubs in Russia
Sport in Kemerovo Oblast
Mining association football teams in Russia
1946 establishments in Russia